Peperomia urocarpa (Also known as Brazilian peperomia) is a species of perennial herb in the genus Peperomia. The native range of Peperomia urocarpa is most of South America, Mexico, and parts of the Caribbean
 Its habit is epiphyte and a herb. In Colombia, its elevation range is 5–2000 Meters.

References

urocarpa
Flora of South America
Flora of Mexico
Flora of the Caribbean
Plants described in 1838
Taxa named by Friedrich Ernst Ludwig von Fischer
Taxa named by Carl Anton von Meyer
Flora without expected TNC conservation status